Baron Emile-Ernest de Cartier de Marchienne (30 November 1871 in Schaerbeek, Belgium – 10 May 1946 in London, United Kingdom) was a Belgian diplomat. Emile de Cartier de Marchienne was Belgian Minister in the United States, China, the United Kingdom, Cuba, Haiti, and the Dominican Republic. Before that he had been the charge d'affaires in Brazil, Japan, China, and France.

Diplomatic career

Honours 
 Civic Decoration
 1919: Commander in the Order of Leopold.
 Grand Cordon in the Order of Leopold.
 Knight Grand Cross with Chain of the Royal Victorian Order.
 Knight Grand Cross of the Order of the British Empire.
 Commander in the Order of the Sacred Treasure.
 Officer in the Legion of Honour.
 Knight of the Order of Saint Gregory the Great.
 Coronation Medal of HM George VI.

Personal life
Ambassador de Cartier de Marchienne married in Paris, on 16 July 1919, American socialite Mrs. Hamilton Wilkes Cary (née Marie E. Dow) who was firstly married to Elihu B. Frost, President of the Submarine Boat Corporation.

He was the uncle of the French novelist Marguerite Yourcenar.

See also
 Louis de Cartier de Marchienne
 Cartier Castle

References

Sources
 Treaty between the United States of America, Belgium, the British Empire, China, France, Italy, Japan, the Netherlands, and Portugal, Signed at Washington February 6, 1922
 The Robert Silvercruys Papers

External links
 
  de CARTIER de MARCHIENNE, Baron Emile-Ernest

1871 births
1946 deaths
Barons of Cartier de Marchienne

Commanders of the Order of the Crown (Belgium)
Belgian people of World War II
People from Schaerbeek
Ambassadors of Belgium to the United Kingdom
Ambassadors of Belgium to the United States